Below is a list of current NBL team rosters:

Current team roster 
There are a total of ten teams.

Adelaide 36ers

Brisbane Bullets

Cairns Taipans

Illawarra Hawks

Melbourne United

New Zealand Breakers

Perth Wildcats

South East Melbourne Phoenix

Sydney Kings

Tasmania JackJumpers

See also

List of current WNBL team rosters
List of NBL1 clubs
List of basketball clubs in Australia
List of current New Zealand NBL team rosters

References

rosters
National Basketball League